Aval Kaathirunnu Avanum is a 1986 Indian Malayalam-language film, directed by P. G. Vishwambharan and produced by K. P. Kottarakkara. The film stars Mammootty, Mukesh, Moon Moon Sen and Sukumari. The film has musical score by Shyam. The movie was a commercial success.

Cast

Mammootty as Gopinath
Mukesh
Moon Moon Sen
Sukumari
Lissy
Karamana Janardanan Nair
Mala Aravindan
Priya
Sairabhanu
Sudheesh
Vanchiyoor Radha
K. P. Kumar

Soundtrack
The music was composed by Shyam and the lyrics were written by Poovachal Khader.

References

External links
 

1986 films
1980s Malayalam-language films
Films directed by P. G. Viswambharan